An Inconvenient Love (with a working title as Open 24Ever) is a 2022 Philippine romantic comedy film starring Belle Mariano and Donny Pangilinan, directed by Petersen Vargas and produced by Star Cinema.  The film was released on November 23, 2022, in 175 cinemas, in the Philippines.

Synopsis 
Ayef (Belle Mariano) works in the 24-Ever convenience store who aspires of becoming a professional animator in Singapore. Her focus on her dream leaves her no time for love until she meets a company heir Manny (Donny Pangilinan), who runs his own plant boutique shop—HalaManny—and who secretly works as a social activist, fighting beside the workers of a corporation owned by his father. After an unexpected meeting, they get along because of their shared belief towards love—it is just another inconvenience. Eventually, they fall in love and agreed to a contractual love with an expiration date. As the feared deadline date nears, will they end their contractual relationship or will love end their inconvenient beliefs?

Cast and characters

Main 

 Belle Mariano as Ayef—a graduating student and aspiring international animator who works part-time at a convenience store named 24-Ever.
 Donny Pangilinan as Manny—22-year-old owner of HalaManny, a boutique plant shop near 24-Ever.

Supporting 
 JC Alcantara as Dobs—Manny's brother, who has autism spectrum disorder (ASD).
 Epy Quizon as Filemon—Ayef's dad
 Matet De Leon as Terry—Ayef's mom
 Adrian Lindayag as Jobert—Ayef's friend and co-worker.
 Iana Bernardez as Kookie—Ayef's friend and co-worker.
 Sheenly Gener as Fetussa—Ayef's friend and co-worker.
 Krissy Aquino as Ben 1—Manny's plant shop helper.
 Brian Sy as Ben 2—Manny's plant shop helper.
 Teresa Loyzaga as Manny's mother
 Lara Quigaman as Manny's stepmom
 Maxene Magalona as Manny's sister
 Tirso Cruz III as Wilfredo Siena—Manny's dad and the owner of the Siena Corp.
 Vance Larena as Dobs' nurse
 Nicco Manalo as a policeman
 Dwein Baltazar as Ayef's professor
 Chino Liu
 Nor Domingo
 Jomari Angeles
 Clara del Rosario
 Aldo Ramzjoo
 Ian Villa
 Nour Hooshmand
 Ash Nicanor

Source:

Production

Development
An Inconvenient Love marked the return of Star Cinema in the big screen and was the 30th Anniversary offering of the film outfit. The film was first announced in the finale of the He's Into Her (HIH) All Access Grand Concert on August 27, 2022, at the Smart Araneta Coliseum. On September 14, Star Cinema revealed in their social media accounts about the filming status of the movie saying "Keep your eyes peeled for the full cast reveal coming your way very soon". On September 29, the full cast of the movie was officially announced.

The movie is set in 2022, as evident on how the protagonists dressed up; which exhibits a color palette referencing the eponymous 24-ever Convenience Store, where the lead characters love story blooms, and aimed to represent the young generation. According to Cayanan in an interview with the Philippine Star, "An Inconvenient Love" was written taking reference with DonBelle and what Gen Z's way of expressing love at the present time; with the realization, especially after the pandemic, that life runs fast and people were too busy with their lives. On a separate interview, Donny shared with Metro Style about playing the character of "Manny", as the most challenging role so far in his entire acting career; while commending the superb characterization of Belle as "Ayef".

On a 32-minute Star Cinema special documentary—Donny and Belle:Their Moment—released on November 30, 2022, Donny expressed his hopes about the viewers' take-away on their film, saying "Sana, we're able to move people...and importantly, people are going to fall in love again with Filipino-made movies".

Director

The film sealed as the debut project of Petersen Vargas on Star Cinema. The project was handed to him as a full story line with Donny and Belle as its leads.

Music

On November 15, 2022 Star Cinema has revealed the official soundtrack of the film and was officially released on November 25, 2022. In an Instagram post by Zack Tabudlo, it was revealed that the music video of "Pinadama" will feature the lead stars of the movie, Donny and Belle, and was released on December 4, 2022.

Marketing
On October 21, 2022, the official teaser trailer was released, which offers a preliminary look into the pair as convenience store worker Ayef (Belle Mariano) and covert plant enthusiast Manny (Donny Pangilinan). with over 1 Million views within the first 5 hours of its release, and the official poster three days after, which leads to Twitter Philippines' trending topics domination, right after the release. On October 28, the full trailer of the movie was revealed at the Grand Media Launch event. On November 12, the second trailer was released, which shows confrontational scene from the lead characters. As part of the movie promotion, the lead casts Donny Pangilinan and Belle Mariano embarked on a provincial tours in the Philippines and overseas, named 24Ever Tour, which also includes their guest appearance on a US news program, NBC Palm Springs and in the Philippines' television show It's Showtime (November 29).

Release

Theatrical Run
An Inconvenient Love premiered Tuesday night at the SM Megamall in the Philippines, ahead on its scheduled regular screenings on November 23, 2022.

Streaming

The romantic comedy film premiered on Netflix in February 2023.

Reception

Box office performance
The romantic comedy film grossed ₱15 million in ticket sales as of November 30, 2022 (₱4 million came from its first day).

Screening

Domestic
In the Philippines, the number of the movie screenings was increased from 160 to 175 cinemas.

International
An Inconvenient Love will be shown in 20 countries from November to December 2022, with regular screenings scheduled in Guam, Hong Kong, Singapore, Malaysia, Nigeria, and Cambodia. On November 16, 2022, the Dubai special screenings of An Inconvenient Love scheduled on December 4, 2022, was announced as sold out.

Critical response
Jason Tan Liwag of CNN Philippines expressed in an article saying "An Inconvenient Love captures the social isolation and the need for independence that seems characteristic of coming-of-age narratives post-pandemic...writers Cayanan and Santos situate the young love squarely under the guillotine of socioeconomic and sociopolitical turmoil...[and] with how disingenuous the family drama devolves into and how it tosses discussions of abuse to the side". Nazamel Tabares of Pelikula Mania praised the cinematography of the film saying "this is one of the most good-looking films of Star Cinema in terms of cinematography" and emphasized the effectivity of DonBelle's portrayals with the characters saying "more than the romance, An Inconvenient Love is a coming-of-age story...and it works because of how good Donny and Belle has become as actors". Rafael Bautista of Nylon Manila described the film as a convenient watch saying "the rom-com vibes are there,..but it also cuts surprisingly deep with its story of love and young adulthood in today's world, DonBelle's acting continues to impress with a chemistry that lights up the silver screen". Ryan Oquiza of Rappler shared in an article that the film restores faith in the love team genre emphasizing "[the] An Inconvenient Love has a lot of things going on in the background and sometimes, urgent issues [of the society]...but, focuses on romance. Vargas ingeniously finds a way to have the lovers come to a compromise and to forward the notion that love can overcome obstacles and transform people". Avram Francisco of This is Hype praised the script, the film's visuals and DonBelle's chemistry.

See also
 List of films produced and released by Star Cinema
 List of Philippine films of 2022
 List of highest-grossing Philippine films

Notes

References

External links 
 

2022 films
Star Cinema films
Films shot in the Philippines
Films set in the Philippines
Filipino-language films
2020s Tagalog-language films
2022 romantic comedy films
Philippine romantic comedy films